"Hijo de la Luna" (English: "Son of the Moon") is a song written by José María Cano performed originally by the Spanish band Mecano with lead singer Ana Torroja. It appeared on their 1986 album, Entre el cielo y el suelo, and had great success all over the Spanish-speaking world, as did the album. From 28 December 1998 to 16 January 1999, a cover version by Loona topped the German charts, and reached number two on the Swiss singles' chart.

Original version

Lyrics
The lyrics depict a tragic Romani legend of a Roma woman who awakes at sunrise, begging to the moon to marry a Roma man (calé) the same day. In exchange the moon asks for the woman's first-born as payment.

After the child is born, the woman and man are dismayed to see that his skin is the whitest white and his eyes are grey, even though they both have dark skin and dark eyes. The lyrics explain that the child is an albino, due to being a son of the moon. But the man presumes that the father is a payo (a non-Roma person) and furiously stabs his wife to death. He takes the child and abandons him on a mountain, leaving the child to die of exposure.

Later the baby is said to live happily ever after with the Moon as his mother. When the child cries, the Moon wanes to cradle and comfort him.

The chorus says that the moon wants to be a mother, yet cannot find a lover who will make her his wife, and questions her as to what she would do with a human child. The French translation of the song asks a more precise question (Tell me, silvery moon, You who has no arms, How will you rock the child?), which is answered in the last stanza (And whenever the child cries, She [The Moon] crescents, Turning herself into a light-cradle).

In turn, the Moon doubts the mother's commitment to the little boy, wondering how much she can love her child if she is eager to trade him for a partner.

Track listings
 7" single
 "Hijo de la luna" – 4:21
 "Mujer contra mujer" – 4:06

 CD maxi
 "Hijo de la luna" – 4:18
 "Por la cara" – 3:06
 "El cine" – 4:01

Charts

Weekly charts

Year-end charts

Certifications

Loona version

Dutch recording artist Loona covered the song and released it as the second single from her debut studio album, Lunita (1999). Issued through Urban Records on 23 November 1998, the song topped the German Singles Chart in 1998 and 1999. Loona's version is certified triple gold in Germany and gold in Switzerland.

Track listings
CD single
 "Hijo de la luna" (Sentimiento version) – 4:08
 "Another Christmas Without You" – 4:11

Maxi-CD single
 "Hijo de la luna" (Sentimiento version) – 4:08
 "Hijo de la luna" (Radio remix version) – 3:52
 "Another Christmas Without You" – 4:11
 "Hijo de la luna" (instrumental version) – 4:15
 "Hijo de la luna" (Flip Mjc acappella version) – 3:20

Charts

Weekly charts

Year-end charts

Certifications

Other versions
This song was covered by the Spanish Sopranist Montserrat Caballé, by the metal band Haggard and by the band Stravaganzza.

References

 

1986 songs
1989 singles
1991 singles
1998 singles
Mecano songs
Loona (singer) songs
Number-one singles in Germany
Spanish-language songs
Ariola Records singles
Songs written by José María Cano
Songs about the Moon